The Girl from the Chartreuse (original title: La Petite Chartreuse) is a French novel written by Pierre Péju and published for the first time in France in 2002. It has been translated in several other languages including English and it has been adapted in an eponymous film by Jean-Pierre Denis.

The film
The adapted film was shot in 2004, in the French Alps around Grenoble, and released in France and Belgium in 2005. It stars Olivier Gourmet, Marie-Josée Croze, Yves Jacques and young newcomer Bertille Noël-Bruneau. The scenario was co-written by director Jean-Pierre Denis with Yvon Rouvé. The original soundtrack was composed by Michel Portal.

External links

2002 French novels
French drama films
2005 films
2005 drama films
2000s French-language films
Films directed by Jean-Pierre Denis
2000s French films